Zhang Chen (born on December 17, 1981) is a Chinese footballer who plays as a goalkeeper.

Club career
Zhang Chen started his professional soccer career after he graduated from the Shanghai Pudong youth team in 2001 to the senior team and was part of the squad that won promoted to the top tier of the Chinese soccer league system at the renamed Shanghai International. After several seasons he transferred to top tier club Shanghai Shenhua in the 2006 season as reserve choice goalkeeper. However, before he was allowed to establish himself within the squad Shanghai Shenhua merged with Shanghai United F.C. that brought about an influx of players and Zhang Chen found himself competing with significantly more players for places. Despite this Zhang Chen continued to play for Shanghai and was rewarded with his persistence when he was named as the first choice goalkeeper for Shanghai Shenhua at the beginning of the 2009 season against Singapore Armed Forces in the AFC Champions League. However his reign was short lived and he was replaced by Qiu Shengjiong after a disappointing performance against Kashima Antlers where Shanghai lost an AFC Champions League game. As the season progressed he would be relegated to third choice goalkeeper and at the beginning of the 2010 league season he would move to second tier club Pudong Zobon F.C. to gain more playing time.

Zhang transferred to Shenyang Dongjin in February 2011 before another transfer to Chengdu Blades in January 2012.

Honours
Shanghai International
Chinese Jia B league: 2001

References

External links
Player Profile at Shanghai Shenhua Website
Player Profile at Football-lineups website
Player Profile at Sodasoccer.com

1981 births
Living people
Chinese footballers
Footballers from Shanghai
Beijing Renhe F.C. players
Shanghai Shenhua F.C. players
Pudong Zobon players
Shenyang Dongjin players
Chengdu Tiancheng F.C. players
Chinese Super League players
China League One players
Association football goalkeepers